Union Township is an inactive township in Randolph County, in the U.S. state of Missouri.

Union Township was named for the federal union.

References

Townships in Missouri
Townships in Randolph County, Missouri